The McFadden House is a Westchester Deluxe Plan model of Lustron house which was built in 1949 at 315 W. 5th St. in Holton, Kansas.  It was listed on the National Register of Historic Places in 2001.

It was built by Emery Construction of Topeka, Kansas.

It was deemed notable as "an excellent example of the Lustron House property type, and it is one of only one hundred Lustron houses extant in Kansas. Only a handful of Lustrons were built in eastern Kansas, and this is the only Lustron in Jackson County."

References

Houses on the National Register of Historic Places in Kansas
Houses completed in 1949
Jackson County, Kansas
Lustron houses in Kansas